Boneh Zemin or Boneh Zamin or Boneh-ye Zamin may refer to:
 Boneh-ye Zamin, Gilan